Acamptocladius is a genus of non-biting midges in the subfamily Orthocladiinae of the bloodworm family Chironomidae.

Species
A. reissi Cranston & Sæther, 1982
A. submontanus (Edwards, 1932)

References

Chironomidae